Padmadurg, also known as Kasa fort, is one of five historical sea forts built by Chatrapati Shivaji Maharaj and located in Raigad District Maharashtra, India. It was built by the Marathas to challenge another seaport, Janjira which was controlled by the Siddis.

History
Padmadurg is one of the sea forts built by Maratha King Shivaji in 1676 in order to control the activities in the Arabian sea. It is located in the northwest direction of the Janjira fort at a distance of about 4 km. During cleanup activities in 2012, ASI authorities found around 250 cannonballs of historical value.

The sea fort of Padmadurg is not as big as Janjira but still the fort can be visited and enjoyed. Visiting the fort requires taking permission from the Customs/Navy. The fort was not only a part of Sindhudurg's defenses but was also Shivaji's main ship construction yard. This fort can also be viewed from Janjira.  There was a belt of land from Dandi seashore to Padmadurga but it got blown away under the water in 2004.

This fort can be accessed by boats. Boats are mainly available from Murud-Koliwada.

Restoration
The fort is included in the protected monuments list of Archaeological Survey of India, but as on 2011, the fort and the area is in neglected state and ASI is unable take restoration work for want of resources. During cleanup activities in 2012, ASI authorities found around 250 cannonballs of historical value.
When Maratha King Chatrapati Shivaji Maharaj decided to take on the Siddis of Janjira, his admiral, Daulat Khan, built this fort on an island next to Janjira. The rock, on which the fort was built, was called Kasa and the fort was named Padmadurg. The fort has six bastions.

References

Forts in Raigad district
Sea forts